This page shows the list of '''dams and reservoirs in Russia.

 Baksan Dam
 Boguchany Dam
 Bratsk Dam
 Bureya Dam
 Cheboksary Dam
 Chirkey Dam, Chirkey Reservoir
 Chogray Reservoir
 Gorky Reservoir
 Iovsky Reservoir
 Irganai Dam
 Irkutsk Dam
 Ivankovo Reservoir
 Kama Reservoir
 Kolyma Dam
 Kovdozersky Reservoir
 Krasnodar Reservoir
 Krasnoklutchevskaya Dam
 Krasnoyarsk Dam
 Kuybyshev Reservoir
 Lower Svir Dam
 Narva Dam, Narva Reservoir (shared with Estonia)
 Nizhny Novgorod Dam
 Nizhnekamsk Dam, Nizhnekamsk Reservoir
 Paatsjoki River Dams
 Pavlovka Dam
 Pirengsky Reservoir
 Proletarsky Reservoir
 Rybinsk Dam, Rybinsk Reservoir
 Saratov Dam, Saratov Reservoir
 Sayano-Shushenskaya Dam
 Serebryansky Reservoir
 Sheksna Reservoir
 Tsimlyansk Reservoir
 Uglich Dam, Uglich Reservoir
 Upper Svir Dam
 Ust-Ilimsk Dam
 Vazuzskoye Reservoir
 Verkhnetulomsky Reservoir
 Verkhnevolzhsky Reservoir
 Veselovsky Reservoir
 Vilyuy Dam
 Volga Dam
 Volkhov Dam
 Votkinsk Dam, Votkinsk Reservoir
 Vyshnevolotsk Reservoir
 Zagorsk Dams
 Zeya Dam
 Zhiguli Dam

See also
List of dams and reservoirs

References

Dams in Russia
Russia

Dams and reservoirs